Kuanysh Rymkulov also written as Qwanış Rımqulov (Куаныш Рымкулов or Қуаныш Рымқұлов, born ) is a Kazakhstani male weightlifter, competing in the 85 kg category and representing Kazakhstan at international competitions. He participated at the 1996 Summer Olympics in the 83 kg event. He competed at world championships, most recently at the 1999 World Weightlifting Championships.

Major results

References

External links
 
 

1972 births
Living people
Kazakhstani male weightlifters
Weightlifters at the 1996 Summer Olympics
Olympic weightlifters of Kazakhstan
Place of birth missing (living people)
Weightlifters at the 1994 Asian Games
Asian Games competitors for Kazakhstan